Pitatola is a village in Bajhang District in the Seti Zone of north-western Nepal. It is located in Channa Gavisa and is very near to Kaptad.

Populated places in Bajhang District